Philip Eloff (born 17 September 1978) is an American former rugby union centre. Eloff played for the United States national rugby union team from 2000 to 2007, earning 35 caps.

Early life 
Eloff was born in Thabazimbi, South Africa. He went to college at Northeastern Illinois University and played his club rugby with the Chicago Lions of the Rugby Super League.

Career 
Eloff scored 10 tries in his U.S. international career, ranking him second on the list of all-time U.S. try scorers at the time of his retirement (he has since fallen to fourth). His scoring includes a two-try performance in a win against Spain in a qualifying match for the 2003 Rugby World Cup and three tries against Barbados in a 2006 match.

Eloff played for the U.S. at the 2003 Rugby World Cup, starting all four matches and scoring a try in the US 39–26 victory against Japan.
He participated with the U.S. squad at the 2007 Rugby World Cup, playing in three matches including two starts (missing the first match as he was recovering from injury), and he retired from international play following the 2007 tournament.

Personal life 
Philip Eloff is the older brother of JP Eloff, who starred on the Davenport University rugby team.

See also
 United States national rugby union team
 Chicago Lions

References

1978 births
Living people
People from Thabazimbi Local Municipality
Rugby union scrum-halves
American rugby union players
United States international rugby union players
Rugby union players from Limpopo
Northeastern Illinois University alumni
South African expatriate sportspeople in the United States
South African expatriate rugby union players
Expatriate rugby union players in the United States
Naturalized citizens of the United States
South African rugby union players